Wolfgang Neuß is a German rower. He won a gold medal at the 1962 World Rowing Championships in Lucerne with the men's coxed pair.

References

West German male rowers
World Rowing Championships medalists for Germany
Possibly living people
Year of birth missing
European Rowing Championships medalists